The Esperance River is a river in Gros Islet Quarter in the island country of  Saint Lucia.

See also
List of rivers of Saint Lucia

References
 

Rivers of Saint Lucia